Gen. Mohamed Al-Shrif is a Libyan military officer. Since 2019 he has been the Chief of the General Staff of the Libyan Armed Forces, loyal to the GNA.

Al-Shrif graduated with the 18th patch of the Libyan Military Academy, he participated in the Chadian–Libyan conflict under Khalifa Hafter.

References 

Libyan generals
1960 births
Place of birth missing (living people)
Date of birth missing (living people)
Living people